Universal Music Group Nashville is Universal Music Group's country music subsidiary. Some of the labels in this group include MCA Nashville Records, Mercury Nashville Records, Lost Highway Records, Capitol Records Nashville and EMI Records Nashville. UMG Nashville not only handles these imprints, but also manages the country music catalogues of record labels Universal Music and predecessor companies acquired over the years including ABC Records, Decca Records, Dot Records, DreamWorks Records, Kapp Records, MGM Records and Polydor Records.

Capitol Records Nashville
 

Capitol Records Nashville is a major United States-based record label located in Nashville Tennessee operating as part of the Capitol Music Group. Capitol Nashville was formerly known as Liberty Records from 1991 until 1995 when it was changed back to Capitol. In 1993 Liberty opened a sister label, Patriot Records, but it was closed in 1995. In 1999 EMI launched Virgin Records Nashville but by 2001 Capitol absorbed the short-lived label. Capitol Nashville remained a stand-alone label until 2010 when it launched EMI Nashville. Capitol Nashville is also home to several successful comedy artists who remain on its roster today. On March 23, 2011, Alan Jackson signed with Capitol's EMI Nashville division in conjunction with his own ACR Records label. In late 2012 Capitol Records Nashville became part of the Universal Music Group after a merger between EMI and UMG.

EMI Records Nashville

EMI Records Nashville was formed in 2010 and served as a sister label to Capitol Records Nashville. Its flagship artist was Troy Olsen. Other artists signed to EMI include Eric Church and Alan Jackson (in a shared agreement with his own ACR Records). Universal Music Group acquired EMI in 2012. EMI is currently a part of UMG along with sister label Capitol Records Nashville.

MCA Nashville

MCA Nashville started out as the country music division of Decca Records in 1945, founded by Paul Cohen in New York.  In 1947, Cohen hired Owen Bradley as his assistant working in Nashville.  The country music division moved to Nashville in 1955 as much of the country music recording business was locating there. Bradley succeeded Cohen as head of Decca's Nashville division in 1958 and developed Decca into a country music powerhouse. Decca Nashville was renamed MCA Nashville in 1973.

In 1979, MCA Nashville absorbed the country music roster (including Roy Clark, Barbara Mandrell and The Oak Ridge Boys) and back catalogue of ABC Records including the Dot Records catalogue. In the early 1980s, MCA Nashville signed Reba McEntire and George Strait, two of the greatest selling artists of all time and the mega stars on the record label.

In the 1990s, MCA Nashville briefly revived the Decca label for country music releases, but closed the label after Universal Music absorbed PolyGram and chose to reserve the Decca name for classical music releases. While Decca resumed issuing country music in February 2008, the current Decca country music department has no connection with UMG Nashville. However, MCA Nashville continues to reissue past country releases from Decca, as well as those on the Kapp label.

With the absorption of MCA Records into Geffen Records in 2003, and in 2021 where UMG legally changed the name for it's Philippine division, MCA Nashville is now the only unit of UMG to still use the MCA name.

Mercury Nashville

The still active Mercury Records was formed in Chicago in 1945 issuing recordings in a variety of genres including country music.  The Nashville office of Mercury began as a joint venture between Mercury and "Pappy" Daily's established country music record label Starday Records in January 1957.  In July 1958, the Mercury/Starday joint venture was dissolved, and Starday record producer Shelby Singleton stayed on with Mercury in Nashville, becoming head of Mercury's Nashville office by 1961.  Singleton left Mercury in 1966 to form his own company which bought Sun Records in 1969.

In 1986, American country music singer and songwriter Johnny Cash, after being dropped by Columbia Nashville, signed with Mercury Nashville.  His first album for the label was Johnny Cash Is Coming to Town, and Cash made several albums from 1987 to 1991 with Mercury Nashville. In 1997, PolyGram, which owned Mercury, consolidated all its Nashville operations under the Mercury name.

When PolyGram was purchased by Universal Music Group in 1998, the resulting record label consolidations left Mercury under The Island Def Jam Music Group umbrella making Mercury in the USA dormant until recently, but still active internationally.  The consolidations in Nashville which created UMG Nashville kept the Mercury Nashville imprint active.

Most reissues of country music recordings first issued on the MGM, Polydor, and other former PolyGram labels bear the Mercury Nashville imprint.

Lost Highway Records

Lost Highway Records was formed by Luke Lewis in 2000. Lost Highway Records operates as a country music label, based out of Nashville. The label also issues music by alternative rock and alternative country artists such as Morrissey and Ryan Adams.  The company's name was inspired by a Leon Payne song. Today the label operates as an imprint of Island Records, formerly a division of The Island Def Jam Music Group. Lost Highway has distributed the soundtracks for O Brother, Where Art Thou?, Deadwood, and Open Season by Paul Westerberg. They have also acted as distributor for albums from Johnny Cash and Hank Williams.

Buena Vista Records

Formed in April 2017, Buena Vista Records is a partnership between Disney Music Group and Universal Music Group Nashville.

Artists

External links

Capitol Records Nashville
EMI Records Nashville
MCA Records Nashville
Mercury Records Nashville
Lost Highway Records

References

Record labels based in Nashville, Tennessee
American country music record labels
Record labels based in Tennessee